This article deals with Paul Bäumer the pilot. For the fictional Paul Bäumer, see All Quiet on the Western Front. For the late member of electronic music group Bingo Players, see Bingo Players

Paul Wilhelm Bäumer (11 May 1896 – 15 July 1927) was a German fighter ace in World War I.

Background
Bäumer was born on 11 May 1896 in Duisburg, Germany. He was a dental assistant before World War I, and earned a private pilot's license by Summer 1914.

Involvement in World War I 

At the start of the war, he joined the 70th Infantry Regiment. He served in both France and Russia, being wounded in the arm in the latter. He then transferred to the air service as a dental assistant before being accepted for military pilot training.

By October 1916, he was serving as a ferry pilot and instructor at Armee Flugpark 1. On 19 February 1917, he was promoted to Gefreiter. On 26 March, he was assigned to Flieger Abteilung 7; he was promoted to Unteroffizier on the 29th.

On 15 May 1917, he was awarded the Iron Cross Second Class. He subsequently received training on single-seaters, consequently being posted to fighter duty. Bäumer joined Jagdstaffel 5 on 30 June 1917, scoring three victories as a balloon buster in mid-July before going to the elite Jasta Boelcke.

Bäumer claimed heavily, reaching 18 victories by year end.  He was commissioned in April 1918. On 29 May Bäumer was injured in a crash, breaking his jaw, and he returned to the Jagdstaffel in September. With the arrival of the Fokker D.VII he claimed even more success, including 16 in September. Nicknamed "The Iron Eagle", he flew with a personal emblem of an Edelweiss on his aircraft. He was one of the few pilots in World War I whose lives were saved by parachute deployment, when he was shot down in flames in September. He received the Pour le Mérite shortly before the Armistice and was finally credited with 43 victories, ranking ninth among German aces.

Post-War Career
After the war, Bäumer worked briefly in the dockyards before he became a dentist, and reportedly one of his patients, Erich Maria Remarque, used Bäumer's name for the protagonist of his antiwar novel All Quiet on the Western Front.

Continuing his interest in flying, he founded his own aircraft company in Hamburg. Bäumer died in an air crash at Copenhagen on 15 July 1927, age 31, while test flying a Rohrbach Ro IX fighter, Rohrbach's test pilot had already been involved in a spinning accident, and Bäumer, acting as a freelance test pilot, continued the testing and died after the aircraft entered a spin and crashed in the Øresund.

References

External links 
Paul Bäumer page at theaerodrome.com

Bibliography

Further reading 

1896 births
1927 deaths
Aviators killed in aviation accidents or incidents
German World War I flying aces
Luftstreitkräfte personnel
Military personnel from Duisburg
People from the Rhine Province
Prussian Army personnel
Recipients of the Pour le Mérite (military class)
Victims of aviation accidents or incidents in Denmark
Victims of aviation accidents or incidents in 1927